Junipers Reservoir, also known as Muddy Creek Reservoir, is a man-made lake in Lake County, Oregon, United States, named for the junipers in the area. Muddy Creek and two other streams flow into the lake. The catchment area is mostly pasture with some national forest land.

See also
List of lakes in Oregon

References

Reservoirs in Oregon
Lakes of Lake County, Oregon